Kelsey A. Begaye (January 7, 1951 – August 13, 2021) was elected the fifth president of the Navajo Nation in November 1998, defeating fellow Democrat Joe Shirley, Jr. in the general election. In 2002, he lost to Shirley in his bid for reelection.

References

1951 births
2021 deaths
Presidents of the Navajo Nation
Arizona Democrats
People from Coconino County, Arizona
Speakers of the Navajo Nation Council
20th-century Native Americans
21st-century Native Americans
Native American people from Arizona